These are some of the notable events relating to politics in 2005.

Events

January
 January 1
 The Freedom of Information Act 2000 comes into force in the United Kingdom.
 In Germany, stage IV of the Hartz concept brought together unemployment benefits and social security benefits, despite protests.
 In Switzerland, Ruth Lüthi becomes president of the Council of State of Fribourg; Heinz Albicker becomes president of the government of Schaffhausen; Anne-Catherine Lyon becomes president of the Council of State of Vaud; Brigitte Profos becomes Landammann of Zug.
 January 2 – Aníbal Acevedo Vilá takes office as governor of Puerto Rico.
 January 4 – Violence in Iraq, assassination of the Governor of Baghdad, Ali al-Haidri.
 January 5 – Adam Daniel Rotfeld is sworn in as Foreign Minister of Poland.
 January 7 – Isidore Mvouba becomes Prime Minister of West Congo.
 January 14 – Sergey Morozov is inaugurated as governor of the Ulyanovsk Oblast.
 15 January – Mahmoud Abbas is inaugurated as President of the Palestinian Authority.
 20 January – George W. Bush is sworn in for a second term as President of the United States of America following his 2004 election victory.
 January 24 – Yulia Tymoshenko is named Prime Minister of Ukraine.
 30 January – The people of Iraq vote in elections to choose 275 members of the inaugural Iraqi National Assembly.

February
 8 February – In Denmark, the centre-right coalition of Prime Minister Anders Fogh Rasmussen is returned to power in a General Election, defeating the Social Democrats under Mogens Lykketoft.
 16 February – In the United States, the school board in Staunton, Virginia voted to continue classes in Weekday Religious Education.  This was a milestone in the issue of Separation of church and state in the United States.
 20 February – Spain approves the European Constitution in a consultative referendum, though with a low turnout of 42%.

April
 4 April – Askar Akayev resigns as President of Kyrgyzstan following weeks of popular unrest.
 24 April – Presidential elections in Togo return Faure Gnassingbe to power two months after he was installed by the military following the death of his father, Gnassingbé Eyadéma

May
 5 May – General Election in the United Kingdom sees Tony Blair's Labour government returned to office with a reduced majority of 66.
 18 May – Spanish parliament completes the ratification of the Treaty establishing a Constitution for Europe.
 29 May – France rejects the European Constitution by 55% to 45% in a legally binding referendum, pitching the European Union into a crisis and dealing a serious blow to the ratification process.

June
 1 June
 The United Kingdom assumes the rotating presidency of the European Union.
 The Netherlands rejects the European Constitution by 62% to 38% in a consultative referendum. The result, following closely after the French referendum on 29 May, compounds the crisis surrounding the ratification process.

July
 10 July – Luxembourg approves the ratification of the European Constitution in a consultative referendum by 57% to 43%.

August
 6 August – Conservative Mahmoud Ahmadinejad is sworn in as president of Iran, succeeding Mohammad Khatami.

September
 17 September – New Zealand holds a general election, which Helen Clark's left-wing Labour Party wins, in coalition with the Progressives Party, with confidence and supply from New Zealand First and United Future, with further support from the Green and Māori parties.
 18 September – General Election in Germany produces an inconclusive result, with a narrow majority for the Christian Democratic Union over the governing Social Democratic Party.
 21 September – José Manuel Barroso, President of the European Commission, says that the European Union will probably not have a Constitution 'for two to three years' .

October
 27 October – Political establishment in France is rocked by the spread of rioting among poor immigrant communities in suburbs of the major cities.

November
 4 November – British Work and Pensions Secretary David Blunkett resigns from the Cabinet for the second time in a year, this time over allegations of improper business dealings.
 6 November – Bob O'Connor Democrat defeats Joe Weinroth, Republican for Mayor of Pittsburgh, Pennsylvania.
 8 November – French Prime Minister Dominique de Villepin declares a state of emergency to allow municipal authorities to cope with the rioting across the country.
 21 November – Ariel Sharon, Prime Minister of Israel, resigns from the governing Likud party and founds his own new movement, Kadima.
 22 November – After weeks of negotiations, Angela Merkel is sworn in as the eighth Chancellor of Germany – the first woman and the first East German to hold the post – succeeding Gerhard Schröder.
 23 November – Kenyan President Mwai Kibaki dismisses his entire Cabinet after losing a key referendum on constitutional reform.

December
 6 December – David Cameron becomes the 26th Leader of the British Conservative Party
 15 December – Parliamentary elections are held in Iraq.
 17 December – Evo Morales wins the presidential elections in Bolivia, ousting incumbent Eduardo Rodríguez and becoming the country's first indigenous leader.

Deaths

 January 1 – Shirley Chisholm, first black woman elected to the U.S. Congress (born 1924)
 January 1 – Robert Matsui, Member of the U.S. Congress from Sacramento, California (born 1941)
 January 4 – Ali al-Haidri, Governor of Baghdad
 January 10 – James Forman, American civil rights activist (born 1928)
 January 17 – Zhao Ziyang, reformist Premier of the People's Republic of China and General Secretary of the Communist Party of China (born 1919)
 February 2 – Zurab Zhvania prime minister of Georgia, is suffocated in a gas leak at a friend's home
 February 6 – Gnassingbé Eyadéma President of Togo since 1967, dies of an illness
 February 14 – Former prime minister of Lebanon Rafiq Hariri is assassinated in Beirut in a massive car bomb explosion.
 February 24 – Hans-Jürgen Wischnewski, German politician
 March 8 – Aslan Maskhadov rebel President of Chechnya is killed in battle with Russian troops
 March 28 – Howell Heflin former United States senator from Alabama
 April 2 – Pope John Paul II, Head of the Roman Catholic Church and chief of state of the Vatican City dies of heart failure
 April 6 – Rainier III Prince of Monaco since 1948, second longest-reigning head of state in the world at the time of his death
 August 19 – Mo Mowlam, British MP (born 1949)

See also
 List of years in politics

 
Politics by year
21st century in politics
2000s in politics